Lamon Jack Dillard (October 25, 1896 – April 1965) was an American Negro league pitcher in the 1920s and 1930s.

A native of Houma, Louisiana, Dillard made his Negro leagues debut in 1927 with the Lincoln Giants. He went on to play for the Bacharach Giants in 1932. Dillard died in New York, New York in 1965 at age 68.

References

External links
 and Seamheads

1896 births
1965 deaths
Date of death missing
Bacharach Giants players
Lincoln Giants players
Baseball pitchers
Baseball players from Louisiana
Sportspeople from Houma, Louisiana